Goudsche Zwemclub DONK, F.N.A. Donk Gouda, is a Dutch water polo club from Gouda. It is best known for its women's team, which won three of the first four editions of the LEN Champions' Cup. It has also won nine national championships and eleven national cups, most recently attaining its sixth double in 2011.

Titles
 Women
 LEN Champions' Cup
 1988, 1989, 1991
 Dutch Championship
 1985, 1987, 1988, 1990, 1992, 1998, 1999, 2005, 2011
 KNZB Beker
 1988, 1989, 1990, 1991, 1992, 1994, 1998, 2000, 2001, 2005, 2011
 Men
 Dutch Championship
 1923, 1954, 1957, 2008, 2009, 2010
 KNZB Beker
 2008, 2009, 2010

References

Water polo clubs in the Netherlands
LEN Women's Champions' Cup clubs
Sports clubs in South Holland
Sport in Gouda, South Holland